Charles Duncan Finlayson (25 February 1903 – 27 March 1953) was a South African cricketer who played four first class cricket matches for Eastern Province cricket team between 1926 and 1932.

External links
 

1903 births
1953 deaths
Cricketers from Port Elizabeth
Eastern Province cricketers
South African cricketers